.tc is the Internet country code top-level domain (ccTLD) for Turks and Caicos Islands. Since T.C. also stands for Türkiye Cumhuriyeti (Republic of Turkey), the domain is used by some Turkish sites as well. The .tc TLD was registered in January 1997.

Second-Level Domains
In addition to the direct .tc domains offered by the registry, there is also a small range of second-level domains that a client can register under:

 .com.tc
 .net.tc
 .org.tc
 .pro.tc

See also

Internet in the Turks and Caicos Islands
Internet in the United Kingdom
.uk

References

External links 
 IANA .tc whois information
 .tc domain registration website

Country code top-level domains
Communications in the Turks and Caicos Islands
Computer-related introductions in 1997

sv:Toppdomän#T